Peter Thompson may refer to:

Sports
 Peter Thompson (cricketer) (born 1965), Barbadian cricketer
 Peter Thompson (footballer, born 1942) (1942–2018), English football outside left
 Peter Thompson (footballer, born 1936) (born 1936), English football centre forward
 Peter Thompson (Northern Ireland footballer) (born 1984), Northern Irish football player
 Peter Thompson (rugby union) (1922–1997), rugby union player who represented Australia

Others
 Sir Peter Thompson (antiquarian) (1698–1770), merchant, MP and collector from Poole
 Peter Thompson (Medal of Honor) (1854–1928), survivor of the Battle of Little Bighorn
 Peter Thompson (broadcaster) (born 1952), Australian broadcast journalist and educator
 Peter Thompson, professor at University of York, UK and creator of the Thatcher effect

See also
 Peter Thompson dress, a sailor dress, after the c.1900 American former naval tailor credited with creating the style
 Peter Thomson (disambiguation)